In ballet, the corps de ballet (French for "body of the little dance") is the group of dancers who are not principal dancers or soloists. They are a permanent part of the ballet company and often work as a backdrop for the principal dancers.

A corps de ballet works as one, with synchronized movements and corresponding positioning on the stage. Specific roles are sometimes made for the corps de ballet, such as Swan Lake,  the Snow Corps de Ballet and the Flower Corps in The Nutcracker.

See also
Ballet dancer

References
 

Ballet occupations
Ballet terminology

it:Glossario della danza classica#Corps de ballet